Schwarzwasser is German for "black water" and may refer to:

Rivers and streams:

 Schwarzwasser (Aller), tributary of the Aller in the southeast of the Lüneburg Heath
 Schwarzwasser (Breitach) oder Schwarzwasserbach, tributary of the Breitach in Mittelberg, Vorarlberg
 Schwarzwasser (Mulde), tributary of the Zwickau Mulde in the Ore Mountains
 Schwarzwasser (Preßnitz), tributary of the Preßnitz in the Ore Mountains
 Schwarzwasser (Katzbach), tributary of the Katzbach in Poland
 Schwarzwasser (Schweidnitzer Weistritz), tributary of the Schweidnitzer Weistritz in Poland
 Schwarzwasser (Sense), tributary of the Sense in the canton of Berne
 Schwarzwasser, tributary of the Vistula in Poland, see Wda
 Hoyerswerdaer Schwarzwasser, tributary of the Black Elster in Lusatia
 Warthaer Schwarzwasser, branch of the Hoyerswerdaer Schwarzwasser between Königswartha and the Knappensee
 Schwarzwassergraben, canal diverting the Hoyerswerdaer Schwarzwasser near Groß Särchen
 Schwarzwasser, another name for the Black Pockau, Ore Mountains
 Ruhlander Schwarzwasser, tributary of the Black Elster near Ruhland in Lusatia
 Černý potok (Vidnavka), tributary of the Vidnavka in Czech Republic

Places:

 Schwarzwasser bei Neustadt (Dosse), village in the county of Ostprignitz-Ruppin
 German name for the town of Strumień on the Vistula in Těšín Silesia
 German name of the town of Czarna Woda, Voivodshop of Pomerania
 German name for the village of Černá Voda (Orlické Záhoří) in Czech Republic
 former (no longer used) German name for the village of Neirivue in the canton of Freiburg, Switzerland
 German name for the municipality of Černá Voda in Czech Silesia
 German name of the village of Černá Voda (Žacléř) of the municipality of Žacléř in Czech Republic
 German name of the village of Săcel in the Sibiu County (Hermannstadt), Romania
 German name of the municipality of Čierna Voda in Slovakia
 German name of the municipality of Čierny Balog in Slovakia

In German the term Schwarzwasser may also refer to a blackwater river or blackwater (waste).

See also 
 Schwarzwassertal (disambiguation)

Jewish surnames